
De Heer Kocken is a restaurant in Vught, Netherlands. It is a fine dining restaurant that was awarded one Michelin star for the period 2009–present.

GaultMillau awarded the restaurant 13 out of 20 points.

Head chef of De Heer Kocken is John Kocken.

See also
List of Michelin starred restaurants in the Netherlands

References

External links
 Photo

Restaurants in the Netherlands
Michelin Guide starred restaurants in the Netherlands
De Heer Kocken
De Heer Kocken